Richard Martin Cox (born 12 March 1963) is an English cricketer who has also worked as a coach and administrator. He played Minor Counties cricket for Herefordshire, and has served in various administrative roles, most notably as CEO of the Royal Dutch Cricket Board between 2009 and 2015.

Cox returned to the UK to head up Cricket Shropshire as General Manager in April 2015. He was then recruited to the ECB as Regional Manager for the West Midlands beginning in November 2016, a position he held until December 2020.

From 2021 he has been integrally involved in the development of Blind Summit Coaching Training and Management nurturing a number of projects across the game as a consultant. In the Autumn of 2022 he took on the role as Lead Officer of Herefordshire Cricket on an interim basis.

Playing career 
Cox was born in Birmingham, and attended King Edward's School. In 1992 to 1995, he represented Herefordshire in the Minor Counties Championship and MCCA Trophy.

In 1998, Cox also played in the latter competition for the Warwickshire Cricket Board. His club cricket was played in the Birmingham and District League, for West Bromwich Dartmouth , Harborne (2000) and Halesowen clubs. A longtime member of the Marylebone Cricket Club, Cox was a member of an MCC side that toured Gibraltar in 1993, playing a series of matches against local teams.

Throughout this Cox remained an active cricketer in the Birmingham and District Premier League. During the period winning 15 titles in all whilst at West Bromwich Dartmouth and Halesowen. He also recently coached Halesowen CC to the Worcestershire County Cup and Division 1 promotion titles whilst representing Shropshire and then latterly Worcestershire in the ECB 50+ County Championships. Cox is an ECB Level 4 Coach and Mentor to coaches across the ECB Coach Development Programme.

Coaching career 

Cox was the first ever ECB Level 4 Coach in Warwickshire whilst being a Senior Staff Coach and Educator for ECB. In 1992 he was invited to coach the Gibraltar national team, with his first major tournament in charge being the 1994 ICC Trophy in Kenya. He also served as Gibraltar's coach at the 1997 and 2001 editions of the ICC Trophy, as well as various European competitions. In 2001 and 2003 Gibraltar won the European Division 2 titles under Cox's tutelage.

During his other coaching activities Cox's notable achievements included overseeing the production line of players at Warwickshire notably Wagh, Singh, Powell, Troughton, Bell and Westwood and more latterly Woakes and Moeen Ali. He was also appointed and ran the ICC Europe Academies for men and women from 1999 to 2009 whilst picking up coaching experience in many countries around the world. During his time in Holland he coached the Dutch Women's teams to European Championship success in 2012 and ECB T20 tournament successes in 2013 and 2014.

He remains a mentor to ECB Level 3 and 4 coaches working alongside many current players and coaches at first class clubs as well as the Women's Game. In 2018 Cox was appointed to the position of National Coach of the Cyprus team that competed in the ICC T20I World Cup Qualifier in the Netherlands and in 2022 a similar qualification event in Finland. In 2021 he worked in the Central Sparks Academy Coaching Team as Asst Coach.

In addition to his role in Cyprus he acts as a Cricket Advisor to the Estonian Cricket Association across tournaments and matchplay programmes.

Administration & Playing career 

Cox started out as Cricket Development Officer in 1989 at Warwickshire County Cricket Club. He was one of the first 4 appointed across the UK at the time. During his 22-year stint at Edgbaston Cox moved from this role to Director of Youth cricket and then Director of Cricket. In this period he oversaw the co-ordination of schools, club and county cricket under one umbrella body known as the Warwickshire Cricket Board. An active Coach Education tutor to this day Cox remains a mentor for aspiring coaches on behalf of ECB and continues to work alongside ECB Level 3 coaches who are forging their career in the game. Cox has served on numerous ECB bodies during his career and in particular a close association with the ECB Birmingham and District Premier Cricket League where he played for 44 seasons until his retirement in 2018.

In 1998, Cox was named Director of the Warwickshire Cricket Board responsible for the administration of all Recreational cricket in Warwickshire. An article in The Independent the following year said the WCB had "actively opened doors" for the British Asian community, setting an example for the rest of England. In 2006, Cox was additionally named director of the Warwickshire County Cricket Club's academy. He held both roles as well as a management board position at Warwickshire County Cricket Club until July 2009, when a reorganization was carried out that eliminated his positions.

He quickly acquired the post of Director of Cricket at the locally renowned sporting and academic institution Bromsgrove School where he coached Cricket and Badminton until December 2009.

In January 2010, Cox was appointed chief executive officer of the Royal Dutch Cricket Board, the governing body of cricket in the Netherlands. He remained in the position until his resignation in January 2015. During his tenure, Cox emphasised the need to professionalise the sport in the Netherlands, and to build ties with the England and Wales Cricket Board. One of his initiatives was to establish the North Sea Pro Series with Scotland, the first professional competition for Dutch players. It was during his tenure that Cox was instrumental in pushing for full time player contracts that coincided with the Netherlands being invited in to the ECBs Pro 40 Competition sponsored by Clydesdale Bank. Cox's lasting legacy was to see the National Team compete on the International stage amongst its counterparts with some success.

On his return to the UK he was engaged as General Manager of Cricket Shropshire. Cox's resurrection of the fortunes of Cricket Shropshire saw a quick turn-round in the playing and financial fortunes both on and off the field and as a result he was recruited by ECB into the role of Regional Manager for the West Midlands to oversee the ECB's new five-year plan - Cricket Unleashed. With some success Cox then turned his attentions to the next phase of the ECB Plans for 'Inspiring Generations' as he oversaw a change in Governance of the game across the West Midlands to ensure growth and increased participation across a number of sectors of the sport.

In 2017 Cox was recruited to assess and reform the ECB Birmingham and District Premier Cricket League which resulted in wide-ranging changes for nearly 400 clubs and 5 County Cricket Leagues across the West Midlands in the re-formatting of League Cricket. Cox entitled the work 'The Blueprint' and completed it in 2018. The new structure commenced in 2019 with expectations high on the future of the club cricket game. Covid played its part in 2020 and 2021 in the setting of the League set-ups but in 2022 he was once again engaged to drive up standards across off-the-field activities of the clubs auditing and analysing the health of the clubs.

It was 2021 that saw Cox elected to the Board of the Birmingham and District League to support the improvement of facilities and clubs which coincided with his move from ECB in December 2021. Quickly he began to work with various partners to support Cricket Admin and Coaching as part of Blind Summit Coaching Training and Management. He currently occupies the seat of Head of Development covering Governance, Sports Admin, Coaching and Coach Development often supporting various ECB programmes. Other areas of the business include Education to 18+ as well as Health and Welfare of SEND students.

In the Autumn of 2022 Cox returned to his former County Herefordshire CCC as Interim Lead Officer for Cricket in the County whilst an external review of Cricket structures was being conducted with a view to a new strategic way forward for the county. His immediate impact was to re-jig the Marches League programme to one attuned to Worcestershire Cricket whilst it retained its identity and profile.

Off the Field 

Not much is known of Cox's life outside cricket other than his social media profiles which tend to stick to Cricket. It is thought that he leads a quiet family life with his sons one of whom is an active participant in the Blind Summit Sports and Education programme.

Other than that its not widely known that Cox is an avid pianist and follower of Football and Badminton.

References

External links

1963 births
Living people
English cricket administrators
English cricket coaches
English cricketers
English expatriate sportspeople in the Netherlands
English expatriate sportspeople in Gibraltar
Herefordshire cricketers
People from Edgbaston
Warwickshire Cricket Board cricketers